Donkey Kong, also shortened to DK, is a fictional gorilla in the Donkey Kong and Mario video game series, created by Shigeru Miyamoto. The original Donkey Kong first appeared as the title character and antagonist of the eponymous 1981 game, a platformer by Nintendo, which would lead to the Donkey Kong series. The Donkey Kong Country series was launched in 1994 with a new Donkey Kong as the protagonist (although several installments focus on his friends Diddy Kong and Dixie Kong instead). This version of the character persists as the main one up to today. While the 1980s games' Donkey Kong and the modern Donkey Kong share the same name, the manual for Donkey Kong Country and subsequent games portray the former as Cranky Kong, the latter's grandfather, with the exception of Donkey Kong 64, in which Cranky is depicted as his father. Donkey Kong is considered one of the most popular and iconic characters in video game history.

Mario, the protagonist of the original 1981 game, went on to become the central character of the Mario franchise; the modern Donkey Kong is regularly featured as a guest character in the Mario games. He has also been playable in every entry of the Super Smash Bros. crossover fighting series, and serves as the main antagonist of the Mario vs. Donkey Kong series from 2004 to 2015.

Concept and creation
In 1981, Nintendo was pursuing a license to make a game based on the Popeye comic strip. When this relationship was canceled, Nintendo decided to take the opportunity to create original characters that could then be marketed and used in later games. Shigeru Miyamoto came up with many characters and plot concepts, but he eventually settled on a love triangle between gorilla, carpenter and girlfriend, that mirrored the rivalry between Bluto and Popeye for Olive Oyl.

Bluto was replaced by a large, enraged ape, which Miyamoto said was "nothing too evil or repulsive", and the pet of the main character. Miyamoto has also named "Beauty and the Beast" and the 1933 film King Kong as influences for the character.

Miyamoto used "donkey" to convey "stubborn" in English; while "Kong" was simply to imply him being a "large ape", the name Donkey Kong was intended to convey "stubborn ape" to the American audience. When he suggested this name to Nintendo of America, people laughed, but the name stuck.

The character's appearance was redesigned for the Super NES in 1994 by former Rare character artist Kevin Bayliss with supervision from Miyamoto, who suggested giving Donkey Kong a red tie. Bayliss presented the modern look to Nintendo and was immediately approved for the high-resolution 3D medium. Although the character design has been tweaked over the years, Donkey Kong's appearance remains consistent since the last modification by Bayliss.

Characteristics
The Donkey Kong Country series introduced the setting of Donkey Kong Island and a backstory for the character. The series also introduced Diddy Kong as DK's sidekick and best friend, and K. Rool, King of the Kremlings, as his nemesis who steals his and Diddy Kong's banana hoard. While retaining the red necktie featured in the Game Boy game, Donkey Kong, he also donned a distinct physical appearance featuring heavy brows and a peaked lock of hair on top of his head. This would become the standard look for Donkey Kong still used over two decades later. The modern Donkey Kong is portrayed as a powerful yet laid-back ape, who is interested mainly in his banana hoard and his girlfriend, Candy Kong. He has pugilistic abilities that are often emphasized, featuring as a hidden boss in Punch-Out!!, uppercutting K. Rool out of his castle at the end of Donkey Kong Country 2, and having punch-based attacks as his special and final smash moves in Super Smash Bros. Ultimate. In a match against boxing champion "Krusha" K. Rool in Donkey Kong 64, DK's weight is given at 800 pounds.

The new Donkey Kong introduced in Donkey Kong Country was initially characterized as the grandson of the original Donkey Kong who appears in the game as an elderly ape named Cranky Kong. This remained the most consistent storyline, with it also being directly stated in both Donkey Kong Land and Donkey Kong Country 2: Diddy's Kong Quest, but Donkey Kong 64 portrays the modern Donkey Kong as Cranky Kong's son. Leigh Loveday, the writer of Donkey Kong Country 2, prefacing his statement with "As far as I know", said that he is a grown-up version of Donkey Kong Jr. Nintendo of Europe's website also states that the modern DK is DK Jr.

However, the Game Boy Advance versions of Donkey Kong Country and Donkey Kong Country 2: Diddy's Kong Quest, Super Smash Bros. Brawl, Super Smash Bros. Ultimate, Donkey Kong Country Returns, Donkey Kong Country: Tropical Freeze, Gregg Mayles of Rare, and Playing With Super Power: Nintendo Super NES Classics eGuide all explicitly state that the present-day Donkey Kong is Cranky's grandson.

Appearances

Early history
Donkey Kong first appeared as the titular antagonist of the 1981(July 9th 1981) arcade game Donkey Kong (alongside protagonist Mario and damsel in distress, Pauline). As Mario, the player must reach Donkey Kong at the top of each stage, where he is holding Pauline captive. Donkey Kong attempts to hinder the player's progress by throwing barrels, springs, and other objects towards Mario. The ape reappeared the following year in the sequel Donkey Kong Jr., where Donkey Kong is taken captive and locked in a cage by Mario, while Donkey Kong Junior sets out to rescue him. Donkey Kong resumed his antagonistic role in Donkey Kong 3, this time the character Stanley the Bugman taking Mario's place as the protagonist. Stanley fights Donkey Kong's attempts to invade a greenhouse along with a horde of killer bees.

After Donkey Kong, Mario went on to become Nintendo's primary mascot, while Donkey Kong and his son were relegated to supporting roles and cameos. The 1994 Game Boy version of Donkey Kong marked his re-emergence as a major character. He was redesigned, appearing with a red necktie, which sometimes bears his initials, "DK".

Rare era

The 1994 Super Nintendo Entertainment System game Donkey Kong Country, developed by British game developer Rare, was the beginning of a series. The manual for Donkey Kong Country states that the main protagonist in this game is the grandson of the Donkey Kong from the original trilogy, who is now Cranky Kong. Cranky orchestrates the events of Donkey Kong Land to recreate those of DKC. Despite his name being in the titles, Donkey Kong is the figurative damsel-in-distress in the two sequels to DKC and those to DKL, where he is captured by K. Rool. In these sequels, the player controls Diddy, Dixie, and Kiddy as they set out to rescue Donkey Kong. The Donkey Kong Country series also led to an animated television series and Donkey Kong 64, in which DK is playable once again.

Post-Rare era
Following Rare's departure from the series, Nintendo co-produced a trilogy of rhythm games with Namco for the GameCube known as the Donkey Konga series, which were based on Namco's own Taiko: Drum Master, though only two of the series' games made it to America. Donkey Kong Jungle Beat was released on March 14, 2005, in North America for the GameCube. It depicted DK as being more violent than his original image and also used the bongo controllers. It was also the first game to receive the ESRB E10+ Rating. In October 2007, Donkey Kong Barrel Blast was released in North America for the Wii.

On handheld consoles, Donkey Kong was reunited with his former rival Mario in the 2004 Game Boy Advance game, Mario vs. Donkey Kong. A throwback to the Donkey Kong game for the Game Boy, Donkey Kong resumed his antagonist role from his earlier games by taking over the Mario Toy Company, upset over the lack of Mini-Mario toys available for purchase. The game was followed by a 2006 sequel titled Mario vs. Donkey Kong 2: March of the Minis, where Donkey Kong, who is infatuated with Pauline, kidnaps her and takes her to the roof of the Super Mini-Mario World amusement park when she ignores a Mini Donkey Kong toy in favor of a Mini-Mario. He also once again appeared as the antagonist in Mario vs. Donkey Kong: Minis March Again! and Mario vs. Donkey Kong: Mini-Land Mayhem!. Aside from those, Donkey Kong appeared in DK King of Swing on the GBA around the time of Jungle Beat, and in its sequel, DK Jungle Climber, for the Nintendo DS. In the 2010 Wii game, Donkey Kong Country Returns, Donkey Kong and Diddy Kong get rid of the Tiki Tak Tribe, who appears on Donkey Kong Island and hypnotizes various creatures. In the 2014 Wii U game, Donkey Kong Country: Tropical Freeze, Donkey Kong sets out to get his home back from evil Vikings known as the Snowmads.

Other appearances
Every Mario Kart game has featured a version of Donkey Kong as a playable character. Super Mario Kart featured Donkey Kong Junior as a playable character. The modern Donkey Kong made his first appearance in the series with Mario Kart 64, and been in every game to date since.

In the Mario Party series, he was a playable character in all three titles released for the N64, and also Mario Party 4 for the GameCube, this one being his last playable appearance in the series for some time. He eventually became an "event character" in later games, making appearances as an incidental character on the game board. He made an appearance within Mario Party 8, once again as an incidental character on the game board. Donkey Kong also appears in Mario Party DS and in Mario Party 9 as a non-player character, though he came back as playable in Mario Party 10 and in Mario Party: Star Rush (along with Diddy Kong). Donkey Kong appears as a contender in Mario Party: The Top 100, and later as an unlockable, playable character in Super Mario Party.

Donkey Kong has also made playable appearance in various Mario sports games. Donkey Kong was a selectable character in Mario Tennis, Mario Power Tennis, Mario Tennis: Power Tour, Mario Tennis Open, Mario Tennis: Ultra Smash and Mario Tennis Aces. Donkey Kong is playable in Mario Golf, Mario Golf: Toadstool Tour, Mario Golf: World Tour and Mario Golf: Super Rush but not Mario Golf: Advance Tour. Donkey Kong is featured in Super Mario Strikers for the GameCube and made his first appearance on the Wii within the title Mario Strikers Charged as a playable soccer captain. In Mario Super Sluggers, he appears as a captain again. Donkey Kong also appears in Mario Superstar Baseball. He made a playable appearance in almost every Mario & Sonic game, starting with Mario & Sonic at the Olympic Winter Games. He's also playable in Mario Hoops 3-on-3 and Mario Sports Mix.

He is also playable in each Super Smash Bros. game. Donkey Kong appeared in Super Smash Bros. as the first character from the Donkey Kong series and had a stage called "Kongo Jungle", which was based on Donkey Kong Country. Both he and Kongo Jungle returned for the series second game, Super Smash Bros. Melee. In this game, he had two new stages called "Jungle Japes" and "Kongo Jungle", and a version of the "DK Rap" from Donkey Kong 64 serves as stage music for Kongo Jungle (the one difference in the lyrics being the word "heck" substituted from the word "hell"). He appeared once more in Super Smash Bros. Brawl, this time being joined by his sidekick Diddy Kong and three stages – "Jungle Japes" from Melee, "Rumble Falls" from Donkey Kong Jungle Beat, and "75m" from the original Donkey Kong game from 1981. Both Donkey Kong and Diddy Kong returned to the series in Super Smash Bros. for Nintendo 3DS and Super Smash Bros. for Wii U, with Donkey Kong being among the first wave of amiibo released for the games. Jungle Japes from Melee returns in the 3DS version, and both Kongo Jungle from the original Super Smash Bros. and 75m from Brawl return in the Wii U version, along with a new stage called Jungle Hijinxs from Donkey Kong Country Returns. Along with Bowser, he is also a playable guest character in the Nintendo versions of Skylanders: SuperChargers. Super Mario Maker features Donkey Kong as a Mystery Mushroom costume. Donkey Kong appears as one of the playable characters in the downloadable campaign, Donkey Kong Adventure, for Mario + Rabbids Kingdom Battle.

The character has also made more incidental appearances. Two minor enemies in Super Mario RPG bear a striking resemblance to Donkey Kong. One of the enemies, named "Guerrilla", says "Don't confuse me with someone else", referring to DK. Both Donkey Kong and Donkey Kong, Jr. appear as minor antagonists in the Super Mario Bros.-based adventure book Doors to Doom. Donkey Kong was also featured on the Game & Watch Gallery handheld series and Tetris DS. In Yoshi's Island DS, Donkey Kong appears as "Baby DK", a younger version of himself, similar to Baby Mario. First appearing in World 2–1, most of his gameplay reflects Donkey Kong Jr., even featuring the Snapjaw enemies from the game. He has been seen in the audience of some games in the Punch-Out!! series. He also serves as the hidden opponent in 2009's Punch-Out!! on the Wii. During Rare's time, references were seen throughout Rare's games. In Banjo-Tooie, Bottle's daughter, Goggles, is seen holding a Donkey Kong plush doll. Also in the worker's quarters in Grunty's Industries, the DK logo is seen on the fridge.

Outside of video games, Donkey Kong has made several appearances in animation. The 1983 animated anthology series Saturday Supercade featured cartoon segments based on the original Donkey Kong arcade game. In the segments, Donkey Kong, voiced by Soupy Sales, was an escaped circus gorilla on the run from Mario and Pauline, who seek to recapture him. A second series of segments based on Donkey Kong Jr. focused on the title character, voiced by Frank Welker, who sought to find his missing father after his escape from the circus. Donkey Kong later appeared as a recurring antagonist in the 1989 animated series Captain N: The Game Master, voiced by Garry Chalk. He is depicted as the territorial and easily angered ruler of Kongoland, and must be fed to be appeased. Donkey Kong was also the main character of the 1996 Donkey Kong Country animated series, in which Donkey Kong fought to protect Kongo Bongo Island and the mystical Crystal Coconut from King K. Rool and his Kremling henchmen. Donkey Kong was voiced by Richard Yearwood, with his singing voice performed by Sterling Jarvis. In the 1993 film Super Mario Bros., the character of Anthony "D.K." Scapelli, portrayed by Gianni Russo, is based on Donkey Kong, depicted as the owner of a rival plumbing company to the titular Mario Mario, portrayed by Bob Hoskins, who insults Mario's and Luigi's girlfriends in front of a construction and dig site. At the film's conclusion, Scapelli is inadvertently devolved into a chimpanzee by King Koopa. Donkey Kong will be voiced by Seth Rogen in the upcoming 2023 film The Super Mario Bros. Movie by Illumination Entertainment. In November 2021, reports surfaced that stated Illumination had begun development on a Donkey Kong spin-off film, with Rogen set to reprise his role.

Reception and legacy
Donkey Kong has been described as one of the most iconic mascots for Nintendo. In their 250th issue in January 2010, Nintendo Power ranked him as their eighth-favorite Nintendo hero, stating that while he is a somewhat goofy hero, he is decently good overall and an entertaining one. They also ranked him as their eighth-favorite Nintendo villain, joking that one should avoid him if he isn't wearing a tie. IGN criticized his tie, stating that "DK needs a fashion makeover". They said that while he "used to be a working icon", "his status is starting to show signs of rust". 1UP.com listed him as the most "Gracelessly Aging Character", citing the fact that the original Donkey Kong from the arcade game eventually became Cranky Kong. IGN ranked him 5th in their "Top 100 Videogames Villains" list for his earlier appearances. UGO.com listed Donkey Kong seventh on their list of "The 25 Awesomest Hidden Characters" for his cameo appearance in Punch-Out!!. Empire also included him on their list of the 50 greatest video game characters, adding that he is "the worst named character in the history of gaming". The 2011 Guinness World Records Gamer's Edition lists Donkey Kong as the 33rd-most popular video game character. In 2012, GamesRadar ranked him as the 25th-best hero in video games. Jeremy Parish of Polygon ranked 73 fighters from Super Smash Bros. Ultimate "from garbage to glorious", listing Donkey Kong as 22nd, stating that "we'd love to play as Donkey Kong. This guy, though? He's just the latter-day imposter version from Donkey Kong Country — the original DK's son". Gavin Jasper of Den of Geek ranked Donkey Kong in 13th place of Super Smash Bros. Ultimate characters, stating that "DK is a blast to play as, especially when unleashing his ground-slap move in a match against seven opponents and everyone's bouncing around like ping-pong balls. His wind-up punch is perfect, too". HobbyConsolas also included Donkey Kong on their "The 30 best heroes of the last 30 years".

See also

 List of Donkey Kong video games
 List of fictional primates

Notes

References

External links
 Donkey Kong – Play Nintendo
 DK Vine
 Donkey Kong Wiki

Animal characters in video games
Anthropomorphic video game characters
Donkey Kong characters
Fictional gorillas
Fictional boxers
Male characters in video games
Mario (franchise) characters
Mario (franchise) enemies
Nintendo antagonists
Nintendo protagonists
Punch-Out!! characters
Super Smash Bros. fighters
Video game bosses
Video game characters introduced in 1981
Video game characters with superhuman strength
Video game mascots